The Swift DB4 is an open-wheel formula racing car chassis, designed, developed and built by American Company Swift Engineering, for the Formula Atlantic spec-series, between 1987 and 1997. It won the championship five times, with four championships won four consecutive years in a row (1988, 1990–1993).

Technical Changes Over Time 

 Initially released with the Ford BDA, the Swift DB4 was modified to fit the Toyota 4AGE when the rules favoured doing so.
 EFI became available in the early 90's by use of the "PLAYERS ATLANTIC CHAMPIONSHIP" ECU developed by EFI USA and the mechanical side was developed by TRD.
 Composites on the chassis originally utilised E Glass then later S Glass and lastly a Carbon/Glass sandwich for the upper chassis. The lower part of the chassis remained a aluminium honeycomb for all Swift DB4s produced.

Early Racing History as Written by Murray Mac 

The first SWIFT DB4 Formula Atlantic cars were built in Anaheim, California. The first car was chassis number 017-87, being the 17th car built by Swift Cars in 1987. After the successful DB1, DB2 and DB3 models, this was a radical new car to take on the all conquering Tauranac Ralt RT4 from England.

Designer David Bruns built the car around himself, the very first American Formula Atlantic car, a car probably ahead of its time with no air box hanging off the side of the engine. It had a narrow British Staffs five speed gearbox in the back.

The car was tested at Willow Springs by designer David Bruns and Swift founder R.K.Smith before it was taken to Watkins Glen in upstate New York, for the debut race in the hands of Steve Shelton from Florida, who had ordered the first customer car.

At Watkins Glen, Shelton qualified the brand new car on pole for the July 5th race, led the race until he ran over a kerb and folded a front suspension pushrod, more of a development problem than driver error but the car was withdrawn from the race.

The car was rebuilt back in Anaheim then it went up to Portland, Oregon for the next race but in the hands of R.K.Smith. He won a heat along with Jimmy Vasser, who was in the third Swift DB4 built (021-87). In the final R.K.Smith beat Vasser to record the first ever win by a Swift DB4. Jimmy Vasser then went on to win at Laguna Seca over a huge field of Atlantic cars in mid October.

The second car (020-87) was delivered to Stuart Moore Racing in Chicago for Steve Shelton. This was the only black gelcoat car delivered while the fourth car (022-87) for Peter Greenfield of Long Island, New York was in blue gelcoat. All others were white.

Steve Shelton at Road America The ‘blue’ Greenfield DB4 Shelton finished second in his first outing, at Elkhart Lake in Wisconsin while Greenfield also made his debut in his new car at the same meeting. Shelton then finished third at Road Atlanta but went on to win the 1988 HFC Formula Atlantic Championship.
We took the prototype car to Road Atlanta in October for R.K. to race but we had problems in qualifying and only managed eighth on the grid. But with a lot of hard work over night, we solved the engine problem then Smith patiently drove through the field to win the Atlanta race. ‘R.K.’ was in the lead by lap 3 of the 24 lap race and comfortably won the sixty mile race, setting fastest race lap as he scored our second consecutive victory for a DB4.

Then it was onto the biggest race of the year, the November 1st $20,000 Memphis Shootout race where there were over 48 entries. R.K.Smith qualified on pole from Jimmy Vasser but the Ralt RT4 driver Jeff Krosnoff held out Steve Shelton for third fastest. That is how they finished the Memphis race, in the same order! Seven new Swift DB4’s qualified against thirty nine Ralt RT4’s and collected three of the top four results. This caused a huge amount of interest from new car buyers and fifteen new DB4’s were delivered the following year. Our Swift DB4’s dominated the 1988 season winning 18 of 20 races including both Championships with Steve Shelton winning in the East and Dean Hall the West.

References

Swift Engineering vehicles
Formula Atlantic